Strictly The Best vol. 46 is a compilation album released by VP Records. It is released on December 4, 2012, along with Strictly The Best vol. 47.  Strictly The Best (STB), is one of the longest compilation series in reggae music and in the music business.
The series was launched in 1991. Every Year, VP Records releases two STB series, one for reggae and another one for dancehall, a series highlighting the biggest hits and artists in reggae & dancehall of the year from new artists to top stars.
In contrast with a dancehall compilation album STB vol. 47,  STB vol. 46 features lovers rock and conscious reggae tunes that bring listeners to the soft side of reggae. STB vol. 46 is a double-disc album: disc one includes latest reggae hits from Beres Hammond, Freddie McGregor, Morgan Heritage, Romain Virgo, Christopher Martin, Gyptian, Busy Signal, Tarrus Riley, Etana, Jah Cure, Chino, Iba Mahr, and Jamelody. Disc two is a set of classic reggae hits that represent the values and consistency of the series. featuring artists from disc two are: Sanchez, Anthony B, V.C., Jah Mason, Jr. Kelly, George Nooks, Gyptian, Etana, Bascom X, Busy Signal, Terry Linen, Mr. Vegas.
The CD cover was designed and created by Clovis Brown.

Executive producers
Chris Chin

Track listing

Disc 1

Disc 2

References

2012 compilation albums
Reggae compilation albums